Rosana Chouteau was the first woman to be elected chief of the Osage Beaver Band, a clan of the Native American Osage Nation in Oklahoma, in 1875, following the death of her uncle. 

A year after her election, Choteau asserted, "I think my band obey me better than they would a man."

In popular culture 
She is featured (with her name incorrectly spelled as Rosa) in Judy Chicago's installation art piece The Dinner Party.

References

External links

Women in Oklahoma politics
Native American leaders
Osage people
19th-century Native Americans
19th-century Native American women
Native American women in politics
Native American people from Oklahoma